James Edward Glanville (1891 – 18 September 1958) was a Labour Party politician in the United Kingdom.

Glanville worked as a coal miner, and served on the executive of the Durham Miners' Association.  He was elected unopposed as Member of Parliament (MP) for Consett in County Durham at a by-election in November 1943 following the death of the Labour MP David Adams. He held the seat until he retired from the House of Commons at the 1955 general election.

References

External links 
 

1891 births
1958 deaths
Labour Party (UK) MPs for English constituencies
Miners' Federation of Great Britain-sponsored MPs
National Union of Mineworkers-sponsored MPs
UK MPs 1935–1945
UK MPs 1945–1950
UK MPs 1950–1951
UK MPs 1951–1955